Sara Richardson Thomas (born April 21, 1941) is an American educator and politician from Indianola, Mississippi. She was a member of the Mississippi House of Representatives from the 31st District, having first been elected in 1998 to succeed her nephew, Bill Richardson, who had died in office, and having retired in June 2018. She is a member of the Democratic Party.

Background 
Thomas, the daughter of sharecroppers, attended Mississippi Valley State University and Delta State University. She taught language arts in the public elementary schools of Sunflower County, Mississippi for 21 years before becoming a principal. She is married to Arthur Lee Thomas.

Legislative service 
In 1997, her nephew Bill Richardson, who represented the 31st district, died of cancer. Thomas was elected to fill the vacancy in 1998, and would serve in that office for 21 years. In late June 2018, it was announced that she had resigned effective June 30. At that time, she was serving on the House committees on Agriculture, Education, Ethics, Investigating State Offices, Public Property and Youth and Family Affairs.

References

Further reading
 

1941 births
African-American state legislators in Mississippi
Living people
Democratic Party members of the Mississippi House of Representatives
Women state legislators in Mississippi
People from Indianola, Mississippi
20th-century American politicians
20th-century American women politicians
21st-century American politicians
21st-century American women politicians
African-American schoolteachers
American women educators
Schoolteachers from Mississippi
Mississippi Valley State University alumni
Delta State University alumni
American school principals
Women school principals and headteachers
20th-century African-American women
20th-century African-American politicians
21st-century African-American women
21st-century African-American politicians